Dichomeris craspedotis is a moth in the family Gelechiidae. It was described by Edward Meyrick in 1937. It is found in the former Équateur province of the Democratic Republic of the Congo.

References

Moths described in 1937
craspedotis